Prakash Budhathoki (born 21 May 1993) is a Nepali professional footballer from Dharan, Patnali, Sunsari, who currently plays for I-League side NEROCA FC as a midfielder.

International career
Budhathoki played his first official international game with the senior national team on 31 August 2013 in the 2013 SAFF Championship against Bangladesh (2–0), where he played the second half as he came in as a substitute for Jagjit Shrestha. He scored a free kick in SAG 2016 final against India in Guwahati.

Club career
He has started his club career from Friends Club in 2011. And then moved to Three Star Clubtin 1-year contract. Inhe 2013 AFC President's Cup group stages in a match against Taiwan Power Company on 11 May Budhathoki scored to give the Three Star Club a 2-0 lead. Taiwan Power Company would come back to draw 2-2 but the Three Star Club would still advance to the second round.

References

External links
 

1993 births
Living people
Nepalese footballers
Nepal international footballers
Association football midfielders
Footballers at the 2014 Asian Games
Three Star Club players
People from Dharan
Asian Games competitors for Nepal
Nepalese expatriate sportspeople in India
South Asian Games gold medalists for Nepal
South Asian Games medalists in football